Đorđe Jovanović (born 15 February 1999) is a Serbian footballer who plays as a forward for Maccabi Tel Aviv.

Club career

Partizan
Born in Leposavić, Jovanović started playing football with local club Kosmet. After one tournament played in Guča, he was invited to Partizan by Dušan Trbojević. He passed youth categories with the club, and signed his first three-year professional contract with Partizan in summer 2015. He has joined the first team at the beginning of 2016 under coach Ivan Tomić. During 2016, Jovanović usually played for youth team, and also played several friendly matches with the first matches, including games against PAOK, and Polimlje, when he was a scorer. Jovanović made his official debut for Partizan in 20 fixture match of the 2016–17 Serbian SuperLiga season against Čukarički, played on 11 December 2016, replacing Uroš Đurđević in 89 minute. In 2017, Jovanović was optionally loaned to satellite club Teleoptik on dual registration until the end of 2016–17 season in the Serbian League Belgrade. Jovanović scored his first goal for Partizan in 4–2 away victory over Rad on 24 September 2017. Likewise, Jovanović also scored in 3–1 away win against Mačva Šabac on 5 November 2017. Finally, Jovanović scored a twice in 2–2 draw to Napredak Kruševac on 5 May 2018, which was the first start on the pitch in his professional career.

Lokeren
On 2 August 2018, Jovanović signed with Belgium side Lokeren.

Cádiz
Jovanović switched teams and countries again on 31 January 2019, after agreeing to a four-and-a-half-year contract with Cádiz. On 2 September, after being rarely used, he was loaned to Segunda División B side Cartagena, for one year.

On 5 October 2020, Jovanović terminated his contract with Cádiz.

Career statistics

Club

International

Honours
Partizan
 Serbian SuperLiga: 2016–17
 Serbian Cup (2): 2016–17, 2017–18

References

External links
 
 
 
 
 

1999 births
Living people
People from Leposavić
Sportspeople from Mitrovica, Kosovo
Serbian footballers
Association football forwards
Serbian SuperLiga players
FK Partizan players
Belgian Pro League players
K.S.C. Lokeren Oost-Vlaanderen players
Cádiz CF players
FC Cartagena footballers
FK Čukarički players
Serbia youth international footballers
Serbian expatriate footballers
Expatriate footballers in Belgium
Expatriate footballers in Spain
Expatriate footballers in Israel
Serbian expatriate sportspeople in Belgium
Serbian expatriate sportspeople in Spain
Serbian expatriate sportspeople in Israel
Kosovo Serbs
Serbia international footballers